Brennon James Dowrick  (born 27 July 1971) is an Australian gymnast. He competed at the 1992 Summer Olympics and the 1996 Summer Olympics.

References

External links
 

1971 births
Living people
Australian male artistic gymnasts
Olympic gymnasts of Australia
Gymnasts at the 1992 Summer Olympics
Gymnasts at the 1996 Summer Olympics
Recipients of the Medal of the Order of Australia
Sportspeople from Wagga Wagga
Commonwealth Games medallists in gymnastics
Commonwealth Games gold medallists for Australia
Commonwealth Games silver medallists for Australia
Commonwealth Games bronze medallists for Australia
Gymnasts at the 1990 Commonwealth Games
Gymnasts at the 1994 Commonwealth Games
20th-century Australian people
21st-century Australian people
Medallists at the 1990 Commonwealth Games
Medallists at the 1994 Commonwealth Games